Newshour is Al Jazeera English's standard news strand that has been aired since 15 November 2006. With seven editions per day (at 0200, 1000, 1300, 1500, 1800, 2100 and 2300 GMT), Newshour features a live, 60-minute round-up of the latest in global news and sport. It is usually only produced from either Doha or London, Al Jazeera's broadcast centres, and sometimes linked together. Newshour was also shown live on Al Jazeera America during its existence in the morning, midday hours, at 1800 ET and would be cut in if a major world news story breaks. In 2006, Newshour was the first English language news program to be broadcast from the Middle East.

Notable presenters

Doha

Martine Dennis
Folly Bah Thibault
Dareen Abughaida
Darren Jordon
Rob Matheson
Kamahl Santamaria
Adrian Finighan
Richelle Carey
Halla Mohieddeen
Peter Dobbie
Nick Clark
Kim Vinnell
Sohail Rahman

London

Presenters
Felicity Barr
Julie MacDonald
Maryam Nemazee
Barbara Serra
Lauren Taylor

Meteorologists
 Richard Angwin
 Everton Fox
 Steff Gaulter

Sports
 Andy Richardson

See also
AJAM Newshour - Al Jazeera America spin-off of Newshour.

Al Jazeera English original programming
Al Jazeera America original programming
English-language television shows